Unión Deportiva San Sebastián de los Reyes, also known as Sanse is a Spanish football team based in San Sebastián de los Reyes, in the autonomous community of Madrid. Founded in 1971 it plays in Primera División RFEF – Group 1, holding home matches at Estadio Nuevo Matapiñonera, with a capacity of 3,000 seats.

History 
The club was founded in 1971. After several years in the lower divisions of Madrid, the club debuted in Tercera División in the 1985–86 season.

Season to season

2 seasons in Primera División RFEF
19 seasons in Segunda División B
16 seasons in Tercera División

Honours
Tercera División
Champions (3): 2001–02, 2002–03, 2015–16

Current squad
.

Reserve team

References

External links
Official website 
Futbolme team profile 
Club & stadium history – Estadios de España 

Football clubs in the Community of Madrid
Association football clubs established in 1971
1971 establishments in Spain
San Sebastián de los Reyes
Primera Federación clubs